Uroloba calycospila is a moth of the family Pterophoridae. It is known from Argentina.

The wingspan is 19–20 mm. Adults are on wing in January and February.

External links

Pterophorinae
Moths described in 1932
Taxa named by Edward Meyrick
Moths of South America